Maria das Dores de Oliveira (Maria Pankararu) is a Pankararú linguist. She is best known as the first indigenous scholar to have obtained a doctoral degree in Brazil. Her research has focused on the description of the moribund Ofayé language of the Macro-Jê language family, spoken in Brazlândia, Mato Grosso do Sul.

Biography
Born in Tacaratu (Pernambuco), Oliveira accompanied her family to São Paulo in 1970, where she studied until the seventh grade before returning to Tacaratu. She obtained a BA in History at Autarquia de Ensino Superior de Arco Verde in Arcoverde (1990), as well as a second BA in Pedagogy (1997), an MA and a PhD in Linguistics at Universidade Federal de Alagoas in Maceió.

Awards
Medalha do Mérito Universitário "UFAL 45 Anos" (2006)
Heliônia Ceres Prize (2005)

Selected works

Dissertations
Ofayé, a língua do Povo do Mel. Fonologia e Gramática (2006)
A Variação Fonética da Vibrante /r/ na Fala Pankararu. Análise Lingüística e Sociolingüística (2001)

Articles
O verbo em Ofayé: aspectos morfológicos. In: Eliane Barbosa da Silva; Helson Flávio da Silva Sobrinho (orgs.). Língua Falada e Ensino. Reflexões e análises. 1ª ed. Maceió/AL: EDUFAL, 2014, p. 17-19.
As políticas públicas de educação superior para indígenas e afrodescendentes no Brasil: Perspectivas e Desafios. In: MATO, Daniel (Coord.). Educación Superior y Pueblos Indígenas y Afrodescendientes en América Latina. Normas, Políticas y Prácticas. 2ª ed. Caracas: IELSAC-UNESCO, 2012, p. 177-210.
A morfologia nominal da língua Ofayé. In: LUCIANO, Gersem José dos Santos; HOFFMANN, Maria Barroso; OLIVEIRA, Jô Cardoso (Orgs.). Olhares indígenas contemporâneos. 1ª ed. Brasília: Centro Indígena de Estudos e Pesquisa - CINEP, 2012, v. II, p. 22-56.
A classe verbo em Ofaié: aspectos sintáticos. Leitura. Revista do Programa de Pós-Graduação em Letras (UFAL), v. 35, p. 109-131, 2007.
Notas sobre o povo Ofayé e aspectos da fonologia da língua Ofayé. Coletânia AXÉUVYRU, Ed. Universitária da UFPE, p. 141-158, 2005.
Da invisibilidade para a visibilidade: estratégias Pankararu. Índios do Nordeste: Temas e Problemas 4, EDUFAL, v. 4, p. 05-24, 2004.
Variação fonética da vibrante /r/ na fala Pankararu: Análise de fatores lingüísticos. Leitura. Revista do Programa de Pós-Graduação em Letras (UFAL), Maceió - Alagoas, n.25, p. 47-60, 2000.
A variação do /s/ na fala Pankararu - fatores lingüísticos e sociais. In: Maria Denilda Moura. (Org.). Os múltiplos usos da língua. 1ª ed. Maceió: Edufal, 1999, p. 237-239.

References

1964 births
Living people
Linguists from Brazil
Linguists of indigenous languages of South America
Indigenous people of Eastern Brazil
Native American linguists